Maria Elizabet Jorge (born  in Viçosa, Minas Gerais) was a Brazilian female weightlifter, competing in the 53 kg category and representing Brazil at international competitions.

She participated at the 2000 Summer Olympics in the 48 kg event. 
She competed at world championships, most recently at the 1999 World Weightlifting Championships.

Major results

References

External links
 
 http://iwfmasters.net/records/iwf-women.pdf

1957 births
Living people
Brazilian female weightlifters
Weightlifters at the 2000 Summer Olympics
Olympic weightlifters of Brazil
Sportspeople from Minas Gerais
Weightlifters at the 1999 Pan American Games
Pan American Games competitors for Brazil
20th-century Brazilian women
21st-century Brazilian women